Assassinio sul Tevere (Assassination on the Tiber) is a 1979 Italian "poliziottesco"-comedy film directed by Bruno Corbucci. It is the sixth chapter in the Nico Giraldi film series starred by Tomas Milian.

Cast 
 Tomas Milian: Nico Giraldi
 Marina Ripa Di Meana (credited as Marina Lante della Rovere): Eleonora Ruffini
 Angelo Pellegrino: Prosecutor Luciano Canuti
 Roberta Manfredi: Angela Santi
 Bombolo: Venticello
 Marino Masé: Nardelli  
 Enzo Liberti: Otello Santi  
 Massimo Vanni: Gargiulo
 Renato Mori: Galbiati
 Marcello Martana: Trentini

References

External links

1979 films
Films directed by Bruno Corbucci
Films scored by Carlo Rustichelli
Italian crime comedy films
Poliziotteschi films
Films set in Rome
1970s crime comedy films
Films shot in Rome
1970s Italian-language films
1970s Italian films